Shri Shamal Thanedar (born February 22, 1955) is an American businessman, author, and politician serving as the U.S. representative from Michigan's 13th congressional district since 2023. A member of the Democratic Party, Thanedar served as a member of the Michigan House of Representatives from 2021 to 2023. He was also a candidate in the Democratic primary for governor of Michigan in the 2018 election.

Early life and education 
Thanedar grew up in a lower-income family in Belgaum, India. When his father was forced to retire at age 55, the 14-year-old Thanedar worked odd jobs to support his family of eight. He earned a bachelor's degree in chemistry at 18 and then attended a master's program at University of Bombay. He came to the U.S. in 1979 to pursue a PhD at the University of Akron, which he earned in 1982. Thanedar became a U.S. citizen in 1988.

Business career 
Thanedar did post-doctoral work at the University of Michigan before taking a job in 1984 as a researcher at Petrolite Corp.

Chemir 
In 1990, Thanedar took a job working nights and weekends for $15/hour at Chemir/Polytech Laboratories to learn the business. He took out a loan to buy Chemir in 1991 for $75,000. Sales in the first year were $150,000 and the business had three employees. By 2005, Chemir's revenues were $16 million and it employed 160 people, including 40 PhD chemists.

Thanedar borrowed $24 million from Bank of America to finance seven acquisitions, offering the bank a personal guarantee to back the debt. One acquisition, Azopharma, grew rapidly from $1 million in 2003 to $55 million in 2008. Thanedar's group of companies employed 500 people in 2008.

During the 2007–10 recession in the United States, Azopharma's revenue fell by 70%, triggering bankruptcy proceedings by Bank of America. Azopharma closed and its assets were sold for $2 million. During the bankruptcy proceedings, AniClin, one of Azopharma's research facilities of which Thanedar was the sole owner, abruptly closed; a 2010 USA Today article claimed that laboratory animals were abandoned at the facility after the company was placed in receivership. According to later reports, animal welfare organizations facilitated the adoption of all animals in the facility, and Thanedar denied that any animals were abandoned. Chemir remained profitable throughout the legal proceedings and was sold on March 31, 2011, for $23 million. That sale plus the combined assets in the firm covered Thanedar's debt to Bank of America.

Avomeen 
Thanedar briefly retired in 2010, then came out of retirement later that year to launch Avomeen Analytical Services, an Ann Arbor-based chemical testing laboratory, with his son Neil. Avomeen was named to the INC 5000 list of fastest-growing U.S. companies in 2015 (#673) and 2016 (#1365). In 2016, Thanedar sold a majority stake in the business to private equity firm High Street Capital. He shared $1.5 million of the proceeds with his 50 employees.

Thanedar was named the Ernst & Young Entrepreneur of the Year for the Central Midwest Region (Missouri, Kansas, Iowa and Nebraska) in 1999, 2007, and 2016. He maintains 40% ownership of Avomeen.

Lawsuit 
In November 2017, a buyer of Avomeen Holdings LLC filed a lawsuit in the U.S. District Court in Detroit, claiming Thanedar made "fraudulent and misleading representations" of his company's finances in order to sell the majority stake in November 2016. Thanedar denies the allegations, saying that revenues "are anticipated to significantly exceed" those of past periods. U.S. District Judge Gershwin A. Drain dismissed the case in August 2019, citing a notice from Thanedar and Avomeen Holdings LLC that they had reached an agreement to resolve the matter out of court.

Early political career 
Thanedar entered politics when he ran in the 2018 Michigan gubernatorial election as a Democrat. His political platform included a $15 minimum wage, public education reform, infrastructure improvements, and increased government transparency.

2018 gubernatorial campaign 

On April 5, 2017, Thanedar submitted paperwork to raise funds for a potential gubernatorial campaign in Michigan. On June 8, he officially announced his candidacy for governor of Michigan in the 2018 Democratic primary. He pledged not to accept any corporate political action committee donations. Thanedar contributed $10.6 million of his own money to his campaign. Early polling in 2017 showed him in last place at 2% to 3%. After running a statewide Super Bowl ad in February 2018, he quickly became the best-known Democratic candidate for governor. Thanedar won statewide Democratic polls in March (21% to 18%) and April (30% to 26%) versus Gretchen Whitmer, the presumptive Democratic front-runner.

As Thanedar's campaign gained public traction in early 2018, reporters at The Intercept and HuffPost began investigating Thanedar's history. Thanedar had not held elective office before running for governor in 2017, so he did not have an official record as a Democrat. Campaign finance records show that he made 18 donations to Democratic campaigns and one to a Republican campaign before running for office. The Republican donation, $2,300 to the Republican presidential campaign of John McCain, led to controversy that Thanedar might not be as progressive as he claimed. Political strategists who met with Thanedar before his 2018 campaign also claimed that he initially questioned whether he wanted to run as a Democrat or Republican in the gubernatorial race. Thanedar denied the claims, saying that these strategists were criticizing him because he did not hire their firms. He also faced allegations that laboratory animals were abandoned at one of his former research facilities after Bank of America placed that business into receivership in 2010, which he denied.

These controversies hurt Thanedar's campaign and he failed to poll over 30% again. In the primary, he won the City of Detroit, but finished third statewide; he received 200,645 votes (17.7%), placing him in third behind Whitmer's 588,436 votes (52.0%) and Abdul El-Sayed's 342,179 votes (30.2%). Thanedar's support was heavily concentrated in cities like Detroit, Flint, Inkster, and Pontiac with high African American populations.

Thanedar's campaign had spent more money than any other candidate's in either the Democratic or Republican gubernatorial primary. The roughly $10.3 million his campaign spent accounted for nearly one third of the cumulative spending of all candidates in the primaries.

2020 Michigan House of Representatives campaign 
In August 2019, Thanedar submitted paperwork to run for State Representative in Michigan's 3rd district, a portion of the upper east side of Detroit. On August 4, 2020, he won the Democratic primary for the seat. On November 3, 2020, Thanedar was elected to the state house. He assumed office on January 1, 2021.

U.S. House of Representatives

Political Positions

Syria 
In 2023, Thanedar was among 56 Democrats to vote in favor of H.Con.Res. 21, which directed President Joe Biden to remove U.S. troops from Syria within 180 days.

Elections

2022 

In 2022, Thanedar gave up his state house seat to run for Michigan's 13th congressional district. The incumbent, Rashida Tlaib, had her home drawn into the 12th district and was reelected there. Thanedar won the open primary, defeating state senator Adam Hollier and others. He defeated Republican nominee Martell Bivings in the November 8 general election.

Caucus memberships 
 Congressional Progressive Caucus
 New Democrat Coalition

Committee assignments 

 Committee on Homeland Security
 Committee on Small Business

Autobiographies 
Thanedar has written two autobiographies. ही 'श्री' ची इच्छा! (Transliteration: Hī Śrī Cī Icchā; English: This is Shri's Wish) is an autobiography in Marathi, published in 2004. In 2008, Thanedar self-published his memoirs in English, The Blue Suitcase: Tragedy and Triumph in an Immigrant's Life.

References

External links 

 Personal website
 Congressman Shri Thanedar official U.S. House website
 Shri Thanedar for Congress campaign website
 

|-

|-

 

1955 births
20th-century American businesspeople
21st-century American businesspeople
21st-century American politicians
American autobiographers
American people of Indian descent
Asian-American members of the United States House of Representatives
Asian-American people in Michigan politics
Businesspeople from Karnataka
Candidates in the 2018 United States elections
Democratic Party members of the United States House of Representatives from Michigan
Indian emigrants to the United States
Living people
Marathi-language writers
Members of the United States Congress of Indian descent
Michigan Democrats
Naturalized citizens of the United States
People from Belagavi district
University of Akron alumni
University of Michigan people
University of Mumbai alumni